Blub may refer to:

 Blub (water park), an abandoned water park in Berlin
 A hypothetical programming language imagined by programmer Paul Graham
 5,6-dimethylbenzimidazole synthase, an enzyme
 An informal term for crying

See also
Bulb (disambiguation)